Irwindale station is an at-grade light rail station on the L Line of the Los Angeles Metro Rail system. It is located at the intersection of Irwindale Avenue and Avenida Padilla in Irwindale, California, after which the station is named.

This station opened on March 5, 2016, as part of Phase 2A of the Foothill Extension project. This station and all the other original Gold Line and Foothill Extension stations will be part of the A Line upon completion of the Regional Connector project in 2023.

History 
The original train track through Irwindale were built by the Los Angeles and San Gabriel Valley Railroad. The L line uses the old right of way of the Los Angeles and San Gabriel Valley Railroad who built the first train tracks through Irwindale in 1887. The Los Angeles and San Gabriel Valley Railroad was founded in 1883, by James F. Crank with the goal of bringing a rail line to San Gabriel Valley from downtown Los Angeles. Los Angeles and San Gabriel Valley Railroad was sold on May 20, 1887 into the California Central Railway. In 1889 the rail line was consolidated into Southern California Railway Company. On January 17, 1906, the Southern California Railway was sold to the Atchison, Topeka and Santa Fe Railway and called the Pasadena Subdivision. Amtrak-Santa Fe ran the Southwest Chief and Desert Wind over this line through Irwindale, but relocated the Desert Wind to the Fullerton Line in 1986. The Santa Fe line served the San Gabriel Valley until 1994, when the 1994 Northridge earthquake weakened the bridge in Arcadia and the track was closed until the Gold line was built. The rail line crosses the San Gabriel River on a long girder bridge, then passes through the Santa Fe Dam Recreation Area (how it received its name). The rail line intersected the north end of the former SP Azusa Industrial Track at Irwindale (MP 118.2). Irwindale had a 6,165 foot rail siding that passed the Miller Brewing Company's Irwindale brewery. From there the tracks continued and crossed beneath Irwindale Avenue.

Service

Station layout

Hours and frequency

Connections 
, the following connections are available:
 Foothill Transit:

References 

L Line (Los Angeles Metro) stations
Irwindale, California
Railway stations in the United States opened in 2016
2016 establishments in California